Şıhlar can refer to:

 Şıhlar, Alanya
 Şıhlar, Korgun